In finance, a stock index, or stock market index, is an index that measures a stock market, or a subset of the stock market, that helps investors compare current stock price levels with past prices to calculate market performance.

Two of the primary criteria of an index are that it is investable and transparent: The methods of its construction are specified. Investors can invest in a stock market index by buying an index fund, which are structured as either a mutual fund or an exchange-traded fund, and "track" an index. The difference between an index fund's performance and the index, if any, is called tracking error. For a list of major stock market indices, see List of stock market indices.

Types of indices by weighting method
Stock market indices could be segmented by their index weight methodology, or the rules on how stocks are allocated in the index, independent of its stock coverage. For example, the S&P 500 and the S&P 500 Equal Weight both covers the same group of stocks, but S&P 500 is weighted by market capitalization and S&P 500 Equal Weight is an equal weight index. Below is a sample of common index weighting methods. In practice, many indices will impose constraints, such as concentration limits, on these rules.

Market-capitalization weighting based indices weight constituent stocks by its market capitalization (often shortened to "market-cap"), or its stock price by its number of shares outstanding, divided by the total market capitalization of all the constituents in the index. Under the capital asset pricing model, the market-cap weighted market portfolio, which could be approximated with the market-cap weighted equity index portfolio, is mean-variance efficient, meaning that it produces the highest return for a given level of risk. Tracking portfolios of the market-cap weighted equity index could also be mean-variance efficient under the right assumptions, and they could be attractive investment portfolios. A market-cap weighted index can also be thought of as a liquidity-weighted index since the largest-cap stocks tend to have the highest liquidity and the greatest capacity to handle investor flows; portfolios with such stocks could have very high investment capacity.

Free-float adjusted market-capitalization weighting based indices adjust market-cap index weights by each constituent's shares outstanding for closely or strategically held shares that are not generally available to the public market. Such shares may be held by governments, affiliated companies, founders, and employees. Foreign ownership limits imposed by government regulation could also be subject to free-float adjustments. These adjustments inform investors of potential liquidity issues from these holdings that are not apparent from the raw number of a stock's shares outstanding. Free-float adjustments are complex undertakings, and different index providers have different free-float adjustment methods, which could sometimes produce different results.

Price weighting based indices weight constituent stocks by its price per share divided by the sum of all share prices in the index. A price-weighted index can be thought of as a portfolio with one share of each constituent stock. However, a stock split for any constituent stock of the index would cause the weight in the index of the stock that split to decrease, even in the absence of any meaningful change in the fundamentals of that stock. This feature makes price-weighted indices unattractive as benchmarks for passive investment strategies and portfolio managers. Nonetheless, many price-weighted indices, such as the Dow Jones Industrial Average and the Nikkei 225, are followed widely as visible indicators of day-to-day market movements.

Equal weighting based indices give each constituent stocks weights of 1/n, where n represents the number of stocks in the index. This method produces the least-concentrated portfolios. Equal weighting of stocks in an index is considered a naive strategy because it does not show preference towards any single stock. Zeng and Luo (2013) notes that broad market equally weighted indices are factor-indifferent and randomizes factor mispricing. Equal weight stock indices tends to overweight small-cap stocks and to underweight large-cap stocks compared to a market-cap weighted index. These biases tend to give equal weight stock indices higher volatility and lower liquidity than market-cap weight indices. For example, the Barron's 400 Index assigns an equal value of 0.25% to each of the 400 stocks included in the index, which together add up to the 100% whole.

Fundamental factor weighting based indices, or fundamentally based indexes, weight constituent stocks based on stock fundamental factors rather stock financial market data. Fundamental factors could include sales, income, dividends, and other factors analyzed in fundamental analysis. Similar to fundamental analysis, fundamental weighting assumes that stock market prices will converge to an intrinsic price implied by fundamental attributes. Certain fundamental factors are also used in generic factor weighting indices.

Factor weighting based indices weight constituent stocks based on market risk factors of stocks as measured in the context of factor models, such as the Fama–French three-factor model. These indices  Common factors include Growth, Value, Size, Yield, Momentum, Quality, and Volatility. Passive factor investing strategies are sometimes known as "smart beta" strategies. Investors could use factor investment strategies or portfolios to complement a market-cap weighted indexed portfolio by tilting or changing their portfolio exposure to certain factors.

Volatility weighting based indices weight constituent stocks by the inverse of their relative price volatility. Price volatility is defined differently by each index provider, but two common methods include the standard deviation of the past 252 trading days (approximately one calendar year), and the weekly standard deviation of price returns for the past 156 weeks (approximately three calendar years).

Minimum variance weighting based indices weight constituent stocks using a mean-variance optimization process. In a volatility weighted indices, highly volatile stocks are given less weight in the index, while in a minimum variance weighting index, highly volatile stocks that are negatively correlated with the rest of the index can be given relatively larger weights than they would be given in the volatility weighted index.

Types of indices by coverage

Stock market indices may be classified and segmented by the index coverage set of stocks. The coverage of an index is the underlying group of stocks, typically grouped together with some rationale from their underlying economics or underlying investor demand, that the index is trying to represent or track. For example, a 'world' or 'global' stock market index—such as the MSCI World or the S&P Global 100—includes stocks from all over the world, and satisfies investor demand for an index for broad global stocks. Regional indices that make up the MSCI World index, such as the MSCI Emerging Markets index, includes stocks from countries with a similar level of economic development, which satisfies the investor demand for an index for emerging market stocks that may face similar economic fundamentals. The coverage of a stock market index is independent from the weighting method. For example, the S&P 500 market-cap weighted index covers the 500 largest stocks from the S&P Total Market Index, but an equally weighted S&P 500 index is also available with the same coverage.

Global coverage indices represent the performance of the global stock market. For example, the FTSE Global Equity Index Series includes over 16,000 companies.

Regional coverage indices represent the performance of the stock market of a given geographical region. Some examples of these indices are the FTSE Developed Europe Index, and the FTSE Developed Asia Pacific Index.

Country coverage indices represent the performance of the stock market of a given nation—and by proxy, reflects investor sentiment on the state of its economy. The most regularly quoted market indices are national indices composed of the stocks of large companies listed on a nation's largest stock exchanges, such as the S&P 500 Index in the United States, the Nikkei 225 in Japan, the DAX in Germany, the NIFTY 50 in India, and the FTSE 100 in the United Kingdom.

Exchange-based coverage indices may be based on exchange, such as the NASDAQ-100 or groups of exchanges, such as the Euronext 100 or OMX Nordic 40.

Sector-based coverage indices track the performance of specific market sectors. Some examples include the Wilshire US REIT Index which tracks more than 80 real estate investment trusts and the NASDAQ Biotechnology Index which consists of approximately 200 firms in the biotechnology industry.

Presentation of index returns
Some indices, such as the S&P 500 Index, have returns shown calculated with different methods. These versions can differ based on how the index components are weighted and on how dividends are accounted. For example, there are three versions of the S&P 500 Index: price return, which only considers the price of the components, total return, which accounts for dividend reinvestment, and net total return, which accounts for dividend reinvestment after the deduction of a withholding tax.

The Wilshire 4500 and Wilshire 5000 indices have five versions each: full capitalization total return, full capitalization price, float-adjusted total return, float-adjusted price, and equal weight. The difference between the full capitalization, float-adjusted, and equal weight versions is in how index components are weighted.

Criticism of capitalization-weighting
One argument for capitalization weighting is that investors must, in aggregate, hold a capitalization-weighted portfolio anyway. This then gives the average return for all investors; if some investors do worse, other investors must do better (excluding costs).

Indices and passive investment management
Passive management is an investing strategy involving investing in index funds, which are structured as mutual funds or exchange-traded funds that track market indices. The SPIVA (S&P Indices vs. Active) annual "U.S. Scorecard", which measures the performance of indices versus actively managed mutual funds, finds the vast majority of active management mutual funds underperform their benchmarks, such as the S&P 500 Index, after fees.

Unlike a mutual fund, which is priced daily, an exchange-traded fund is priced continuously and is optionable.

Ethical stock market indices
Several indices are based on ethical investing, and include only companies that meet certain ecological or social criteria, such as the Calvert Social Index, Domini 400 Social Index, FTSE4Good Index, Dow Jones Sustainability Index, STOXX Global ESG Leaders Index, several Standard Ethics Aei indices, and the Wilderhill Clean Energy Index. Other ethical stock market indices may be based on diversity weighting (Fernholz, Garvy, and Hannon 1998). In 2010, the Organisation of Islamic Cooperation announced the initiation of a stock index that complies with Sharia's ban on alcohol, tobacco and gambling.

Critics of such initiatives argue that many firms satisfy mechanical "ethical criteria", e.g. regarding board composition or hiring practices, but fail to perform ethically with respect to shareholders, e.g. Enron. Indeed, the seeming "seal of approval" of an ethical index may put investors more at ease, enabling scams. One response to these criticisms is that trust in the corporate management, index criteria, fund or index manager, and securities regulator, can never be replaced by mechanical means, so "market transparency" and "disclosure" are the only long-term-effective paths to fair markets. From a financial perspective, it is not obvious whether ethical indices or ethical funds will out-perform their more conventional counterparts. Theory might suggest that returns would be lower since the investible universe is artificially reduced and with it portfolio efficiency. On the other hand, companies with good social performances might be better run, have more committed workers and customers, and be less likely to suffer reputation damage from incidents (oil spillages, industrial tribunals, etc.) and this might result in lower share price volatility. The empirical evidence on the performance of ethical funds and of ethical firms versus their mainstream comparators is very mixed for both stock and debt markets.

See also 
 Index of accounting articles
 Index of economics articles
 Index of management articles
 List of stock exchanges
 List of stock market indices
 Outline of accounting
 Outline of marketing

References

External links
 

 
Stock market